Bamberg (East Franconian: Bambärch) is a town in Upper Franconia, Germany, on the river Regnitz close to its confluence with the river Main. The town dates back to the 9th century, when its name was derived from the nearby  castle. Cited as one of Germany's most beautiful towns, with medieval streets and Europe's largest intact old city wall, the old town of Bamberg has been a UNESCO World Heritage Site since 1993.

From the 10th century onwards, Bamberg became a key link with the Slav peoples, notably those of Poland and Pomerania. It experienced a period of great prosperity from the 12th century onwards, during which time it was briefly the centre of the Holy Roman Empire. Emperor Henry II was buried in the old town, alongside his wife Kunigunde. The town's architecture from this period strongly influenced that in Northern Germany and Hungary. From the middle of the 13th century onwards, the bishops were princes of the Empire and ruled Bamberg, overseeing the construction of monumental buildings. This growth was complemented by the obtaining of large portions of the estates of the Counts of Meran in 1248 and 1260 by the see, partly through purchase and partly through the appropriation of extinguished fiefs.

Bamberg lost its independence in 1802, following the secularization of church lands, becoming part of Bavaria in 1803. The town was first connected to the German rail system in 1844, which has been an important part of its infrastructure ever since. After a communist uprising took control over Bavaria in the years following World War I, the state government fled to Bamberg and stayed there for almost two years before the Bavarian capital of Munich was retaken by Freikorps units (see Bavarian Soviet Republic). The first republican constitution of Bavaria was passed in Bamberg, becoming known as the Bamberger Verfassung (Bamberg Constitution).

Following the Second World War, Bamberg was an important base for the Bavarian, German, and then American military stationed at Warner Barracks, until closing in 2014.

History

During the post-Roman centuries of Germanic migration and settlement, the region later included in the Diocese of Bamberg was inhabited for the most part by Slavs. The town, first mentioned in 902, grew up by the castle  which gave its name to the Babenberg family. On their extinction, it passed to the Saxon house. The area was Christianized chiefly by the monks of the Benedictine Fulda Abbey, and the land was under the spiritual authority of the Diocese of Würzburg.

In 1007, Holy Roman Emperor Henry II made Bamberg a family inheritance, the seat of a separate diocese. The Emperor's purpose in this was to make the Diocese of Würzburg less unwieldy in size and to give Christianity a firmer footing in the districts of Franconia, east of Bamberg. In 1008, after long negotiations with the Bishops of Würzburg and Eichstätt, who were to cede portions of their dioceses, the boundaries of the new diocese were defined, and Pope John XVIII granted the papal confirmation in the same year. Henry II ordered the building of a new cathedral, which was consecrated 6 May 1012. The church was enriched with gifts from the pope, and Henry had it dedicated in honor of him. In 1017 Henry also founded Michaelsberg Abbey on the Michaelsberg ("Mount St. Michael"), near Bamberg, a Benedictine abbey for the training of the clergy. The emperor and his wife Kunigunde gave large temporal possessions to the new diocese, and it received many privileges out of which grew the secular power of the bishop. Pope Benedict VIII visited Bamberg in 1020 to meet Henry II for discussions concerning the Holy Roman Empire. While he was here he placed the diocese in direct dependence on the Holy See. He also personally consecrated some of Bamberg's churches. For a short time Bamberg was the centre of the Holy Roman Empire. Henry and Kunigunde were both buried in the cathedral.

From the middle of the 13th century onwards, the bishops were princes of the Empire and ruled Bamberg, overseeing the construction of monumental buildings. In 1248 and 1260 the see obtained large portions of the estates of the Counts of Meran, partly through purchase and partly through the appropriation of extinguished fiefs. The old Bishopric of Bamberg was composed of an unbroken territory extending from Schlüsselfeld in a northeasterly direction to the Franconian Forest, and possessed in addition estates in the Duchies of Carinthia and Salzburg, in the Nordgau (the present Upper Palatinate), in Thuringia, and on the Danube. By the changes resulting from the Reformation, the territory of this see was reduced nearly one half in extent. Since 1279 the coat of arms of the city of Bamberg is known in the form of a seal.

The witch trials of the 17th century claimed about one thousand victims in Bamberg, reaching a climax between 1626 and 1631, under the rule of Prince-Bishop Johann Georg II Fuchs von Dornheim. The famous Drudenhaus (witch prison), built in 1627, is no longer standing today; however, detailed accounts of some cases, such as that of Johannes Junius, remain.

Bambrzy are German Poles who are descended from settlers from the Bamberg area who settled in villages around Poznań in the years 1719–1753.

In 1759, the possessions and jurisdictions of the diocese situated in Austria were sold to that state. When the secularization of church lands took place (1802) the diocese covered  and had a population of 207,000. Bamberg thus lost its independence in 1802, becoming part of Bavaria in 1803.

Bamberg was first connected to the German rail system in 1844, which has been an important part of its infrastructure ever since. After a communist uprising took control over Bavaria in the years following World War I, the state government fled to Bamberg and stayed there for almost two years before the Bavarian capital of Munich was retaken by Freikorps units (see Bavarian Soviet Republic). The first republican constitution of Bavaria was passed in Bamberg, becoming known as the Bamberger Verfassung (Bamberg Constitution).

In February 1926 Bamberg served as the venue for the Bamberg Conference, convened by Adolf Hitler in his attempt to foster unity and to stifle dissent within the then-young Nazi party. Bamberg was chosen for its location in Upper Franconia, reasonably close to the residences of the members of the dissident northern Nazi faction but still within Bavaria.

In 1973, the town celebrated the 1,000th anniversary of its founding.

Historical population

Geography
It is situated on the Regnitz river,  before it flows into the Main river.

Its geography is shaped by the Regnitz and by the foothills of the Steigerwald, part of the German uplands. From northeast to southwest, the town is divided into first the Regnitz plain, then one large and several small islands formed by two arms of the Regnitz, and finally the part of town on the hills, the "Hill Town".

The seven hills of Bamberg
Bamberg extends over seven hills, each crowned by a church. This has led to Bamberg being called the "Franconian Rome" — although a running joke among Bamberg's tour guides is to refer to Rome instead as the "Italian Bamberg". The hills are Cathedral Hill, Michaelsberg, Kaulberg/Obere Pfarre, Stefansberg, Jakobsberg, Altenburger Hill and Abtsberg.

Climate
Climate in this area has mild differences between highs and lows, and there is adequate rainfall year-round. The Köppen climate classification subtype for this climate is "Cfb" (Marine West Coast Climate/Oceanic climate), with a certain continental influence as indicated by average winter nighttime temperatures well below zero.

Economy
In 2013 (latest data available) the GDP per inhabitant was €56,723. This places the district 10th out of 96 districts (rural and urban) in Bavaria (overall average: €39,691).

Attractions

The Town of Bamberg was inscribed on the UNESCO World Heritage List in 1993 due to its medieval layout and its well preserved historic buildings. Since the Middle Ages, urban gardening has been practiced in Bamberg. The Market Gardeners’ District together with the City on the Hills and the Island District is an integral part of the World Heritage site. In 2005, the Municipality established a unit to coordinate the implementation of the World Heritage Convention in Bamberg. In 2019, a visitor and interpretation centre opened for the World Heritage site.

Some of the main sights are:

 Bamberg Cathedral (1237), with the tombs of Emperor Henry II and Pope Clement II
 , residence of the bishops in the 16th and 17th centuries
 , residence of the bishops after the 17th century
 Bamberg State Library in the New Residence
Old town hall (1386), built in the middle of the Regnitz river, accessible by two bridges
  ("Little Venice"), a colony of fishermen's houses from the 19th century along one bank of the river Regnitz
 Michaelsberg Abbey, built in the 12th century on one of Bamberg's "Seven Hills." The former Benedictine abbey, which once housed a brewery, is now home to the Franconian Brewery Museum.
 , castle, former residence of the bishops

 Cathedral
Bamberg Cathedral is a late Romanesque building with four towers. It was founded in 1004 by Emperor Henry II, finished in 1012 and consecrated on 6 May 1012. It was later partially destroyed by fire in 1081. The new cathedral, built by Saint Otto of Bamberg, was consecrated in 1111 and in the 13th century received its present late-Romanesque form.

It contains many historic works of art, such as the marble tomb of the founder and his wife, considered one of the greatest works of the sculptor Tilman Riemenschneider, and carved between 1499 and 1513. Another treasure of the cathedral is an equestrian statue known as the Bamberg Horseman. This statue, possibly depicting the emperor Conrad III, most likely dates to the second quarter of the 13th century. The statue also serves as a symbol of the town of Bamberg.

 
The  (New Residence) (1698–1704) was initially occupied by the prince-bishops, and from 1864 to 1867 by the deposed King Otto of Greece. Its  (Rose Garden) overlooks the town. It has over 4500 roses.

 

The  is located on the highest of Bamberg's seven hills. It was mentioned for the first time in 1109. Between 1251 and 1553 it was the residence of Bamberg's bishops. Destroyed in 1553 by Albert Alcibiades, Margrave of Brandenburg-Kulmbach, it was used after scant repairs only as a prison, and increasingly fell into decay.

In 1801, A. F. Marcus bought the castle and completely repaired it. His friend, the famous German writer E.T.A. Hoffmann, who was very impressed by the building, lived there for a while. The next owner, Anton von Greifenstein, in 1818 founded an association to preserve the castle. This society still maintains the entire property today. The Altenburg today houses a restaurant.

 Other sights

The lyceum, formerly a Jesuit college, contains a natural history museum. The old palace was built in 1591 on the site of an old residence of the counts of Babenberg. Monuments include the Maximilian fountain (1880), with statues of King Maximilian I of Bavaria, the emperor Henry II and his wife, Conrad III and Saint Otto, bishop of Bamberg.

There are also tunnels beneath the town. These were originally constructed as mines which supplied sandstone which could be used for construction or as an abrasive cleaner. Mining came to an end in 1920 but a  tunnel network remained. The tunnels were used as an air raid shelter during World War II. A part of the network can be visited on a guided tour.

Beer
Bamberg is known for its smoked Rauchbier and is home to 11 breweries, including Brauerei Fässla, Brauerei Greifenklau, Brauerei Heller-Trum (Schlenkerla), Brauerei Kaiserdom, Keesmann Bräu, Klosterbräu, Mahrs Bräu, Brauerei Spezial, Gasthausbrauerei Ambräusianum, Kron Prinz, and Weyermann Röstmalzbierbrauerei. Weyermann Specialty Malting, founded in Bamberg in 1879, supplies breweries around the world. Every August there is a five-day , a kirmess celebrated with beers. The Franconia region surrounding Bamberg is home to more than 200 breweries. In October and early November many of the 70 breweries in and around Bamberg celebrate Bockbieranstiche with special releases of Bock beer.

Education

The University of Bamberg, named Otto-Friedrich University, offers higher education in the areas of social science, business studies and the humanities, and is attended by more than 12,000 students. The University of Applied Sciences Bamberg offers higher education in the areas of public health. Bamberg is also home to eight secondary schools (gymnasiums):
 Clavius-Gymnasium
 Dientzenhofer-Gymnasium
 Eichendorff-Gymnasium
 E.T.A. Hoffmann-Gymnasium
 Franz-Ludwig-Gymnasium
 Kaiser-Heinrich-Gymnasium
 Maria-Ward-Gymnasium
 Theresianum
There are also numerous other institutes for primary, secondary, technical, vocational and adult education.

Infrastructure

Transport

Railway
The InterCityExpress main line No. 28 (Munich – Nuremberg – Leipzig – Berlin / – Hamburg) and the main line No. 18 (Munich – Nuremberg – Halle – Berlin / – Hamburg) run on the Nuremberg–Bamberg and the Bamberg–Hof lines through the Bamberg station. It takes less than two hours to Munich on the train and with the Nuremberg–Erfurt high-speed railway through the Thuringian mountains finished in 2017 less than three hours to Berlin. Two intercity trains of line no. 17 (Vienna – Warnemünde) and line no. 61 (Leipzig – Nuremberg – Karlsruhe) also run through Bamberg.

East-west connections are poorer. Bamberg is connected to other towns in eastern Upper Franconia such as Bayreuth, Coburg, and Kronach via the Bamberg–Hof line with trains usually running at least every hour. Connections on the Würzburg–Bamberg line to the west are hourly regional trains to Würzburg, which is fully connected to the ICE network. Tourists arriving at Frankfurt International Airport can take advantage of the new direct connection from Frankfurt's main station.

Motorways
Bamberg is not near any of the major (i.e. single-digit) autobahns. But it is nevertheless well connected to the network in all directions: the A70 from Schweinfurt (connecting to the A7 there) to Bayreuth (connecting to the A9) runs along the northern edge of the town. The A73 on the eastern side of town connects Bamberg to Nuremberg (connecting to the A9) and Thuringia, ending at Suhl.

Air transport
Bamberg is served by Bamberg-Breitenau Airfield. Mostly public aircraft operate there. It used to be a military airport. (IATA-Code: ZCD, ICAO-Code: EDQA) It is also possible to charter public flights to and from this airport.

Most international tourists who travel by plane arrive at Frankfurt International Airport or Munich Airport. The nearest major airport is Nuremberg Airport which can be reached within 45mins by car or one hour by train and subway.

Water transport

Both the Rhine-Main-Danube Canal and its predecessor, the Ludwig Canal, begin near Bamberg. The Ludwig Canal was opened in 1846 but closed in 1950 after damage during the second world war. With the completion of the Rhine-Main-Danube Canal in 1992, uninterrupted water transport was again made possible between the North Sea and the Black Sea.

Local public transport
Local public transport within Bamberg relies exclusively on buses. More than 20 routes connect the outlying quarters and some villages in the vicinity to the central bus station. In addition, there are several "Night Lines" (the last of these, though, tend to run around midnight) and some park-and-ride lines from parking lots on the periphery to the town centre.

A short-lived tram system existed in the 1920s.

Military bases
Bamberg was an important base for the Bavarian, German, and then American military stationed at Warner Barracks. Warner Barracks was closed in the fall of 2014, with the last battalion leaving being the 54th Engineer Battalion, and the grounds returned to the German government. In 2016, a large part of the facility was taken over by the German Federal Police for training purposes. Muna Kasserne was a small base occupied by the 504th Maintenance Company, 71st Maintenance Bn. It was part of Warner Barracks although located separately.

Governance
Bamberg is an urban district, or kreisfreie Stadt. Its town council (Stadtrat) and its mayor (Oberbürgermeister) are elected every six years, though not in the same year. Thus, the last municipal election for the town council was in 2014, for the mayor in 2012. As an exception to the six-year term, the term starting in 2012 will take eight years to synchronize the elections with those in the rest of Bavaria.

As of the elections of 16 March 2014, the 44 member strong town council comprises 12 CSU councillors, 10 SPD councillors, 8 Green councillors, 4 councillors of the Bamberger Bürger-Block and 4 of the Freie Wähler (Free Voters), both local political movements. These five parties achieved the number of councillors necessary to form a parliamentary group. In addition, there are 3 councillors of the Bamberger Unabhängige Bürger and the 1 councillor each of the Bamberger Realisten, the FDP and the Bamberger Linke Liste.

The previous council, elected on 2 March 2008, was composed of 15 CSU councillors, 10 SPD councillors, 7 Green councillors, 5 councillors of the Bamberger Bürger-Block and 3 of the Freie Wähler (Free Voters), both local political movements. These five parties achieved the number of councillors necessary to form a parliamentary group. In addition, there were 2 councillors of the Bamberger Realisten and one of the FDP and the Republikaner, making them ineligible for caucus status.

Mayors since 1945

Twin towns – sister cities

Bamberg is twinned with:

 Bedford, England, United Kingdom
 Esztergom, Hungary
 Feldkirchen in Kärnten, Austria
 Prague 1, Czech Republic
 Rodez, France
 Villach, Austria

Notable people

A-K
 Annette von Aretin (1920–2006), first television announcer of the Bayerischer Rundfunk
 Carl Adam Bader (1789 in Bamberg; † 1870 in Berlin), tenor
Lisa Badum
Dorothee Bär (born 1978), Member of Parliament (CSU), State Secretary of the Federal Minister of Transport and Digital Infrastructure
 Wilhelm Batz (1916–1988), Luftwaffe, ace
 Louis-Alexandre Berthier (1753–1815), Chief of Staff to Napoleon Bonaparte
 Joachim Camerarius (1500–1574), humanist, polymath and poet
 Claudia Ciesla (born 1987), Polish-German actress
 Pope Clement II (died 1047), bishop of Bamberg from 1040 to 1046
 Christopher Clavius (1538–1612), mathematician, astronomer and Jesuit
 Conrad III of Germany (1093–1152), king of Germany
 Cunigunde of Luxembourg (c. 975–1040), empress consort, regent of the Holy Roman Empire and wife of Henry II
 Stefan Dassler (born 1962), non-fiction author
 Günther Denzler (born 1948), former district administrator of Bamberg (CSU)
 Karlheinz Deschner (1924–2014), writer and critic of religion and the church
 Gottfried Diener (1907–1987), philologist and Goethe researcher
 Ignaz Dollinger (1770–1841), physician
 Ignaz von Dollinger (1799–1890), important Catholic theologian and church historian
 Curt Echtermeyer, also known as Curt Bruckner (1896–1971), painter
 Erich Ebermayer (1900–1970), writer
 Hans Ehard (1887–1980), lawyer and politician
 Günter Faltin (born 1944), university teacher
 Heinrich Finck (1444–1527), conductor and composer
 Klaus-Dieter Fritsche (born 1953), jurist and politician (CSU), 
 Karl von Gareis (1844–1923), a lawyer and author, member of the Reichstag
 Nora-Eugenie Gomringer (born 1980), poet and writer
 Thomas Gottschalk (born 1950), moderator, TV presenter, actor
 Lukas Görtler (born 1994), football player
 Hans Grassmann (born 1960), physicist and author
 Joseph Heller (1798–1849), collector, today Helleriana in Bamberg State Library
 Karl Höller (1907–1987), composer
 Georg Wilhelm Friedrich Hegel (1770–1831), German philosopher
 Henry II (973–1024), Holy Roman Emperor
 E. T. A. Hoffmann (1776–1822), German author and composer
 Joachim Jung (born 1951), artist
 Harry Koch (born 1969), football player
 Lorenz Krapp (1882–1947), lawyer, poet and politician (BVP, CSU)
 Dieter Kunzelmann (born 1939), communard and left-wing activist
 Paul Lautensack (1478–1558), painter and organist

L-Z

 Paul Maar (born 1937), German writer and illustrator
 Emil Marschalk von Ostheim (1841–1903), historian and collector
 Duke Maximilian Joseph in Bavaria, actually Duke Maximilian Joseph in Bavaria (1808–1888), promoter of Bavarian folk music in the 19th century
 Willy Messerschmitt (1898–1978), German aircraft designer, Flugzeugbau Messerschmitt GmbH
 Wolf-Dieter Montag (1924–2018), German physician, sports medicine specialist, mountain rescue doctor, and international sports administrator
 Christina Morhaubt, convicted of witchcraft and sentenced to death by burning in 1627 during the Bamberg witch trials
 Martin Münz (1785–1848), anatomist and professor
 Ida Noddack-Tacke, (1896–1978), chemist and physicist; she discovered element 75, rhenium
 Christopher Park (born 1987), pianist
 Fiona Parker (born 1991), Olympic silver medalist 
 Bernd Redmann (born 1965), composer and musicologist
 Mike Rose (1932–2006), painter, set designer and writer
 Gerd Schaller (born 1965), conductor
 Rainer Schaller (born 1969), entrepreneur and founder of McFit Fitness GmbH
 Claus Schenk Graf von Stauffenberg (1907–1944), German officer who attempted to assassinate German dictator Adolf Hitler in the July 20 Plot
 Berthold Maria Schenk Graf von Stauffenberg (born 1934), former General of the Bundeswehr
Franz-Ludwig Schenk Graf von Stauffenberg (born 1938), former Bavarian European parliament member 
 Ritter Josef von Schmitt (1838–1907), German noble, Court President for the Kingdom of Bavaria, advisor to Prince Luitpold of Bavaria, Privy councilor and an Honorary Citizen of the city of Bamberg.
 Gottfried von Schmitt (1827–1908), German noble, member of Supreme court and member of Upper Council of Bavaria.
 Josef Schmitt (1875–1944), German noble and Privy councillor.
 Gottfried Schmitt (1865–1919), German politician
 Josh Shipp (born 1986), professional basketball player for Brose Baskets Bamberg
 Tom Schütz (born 1988), football player
 Sven Schultze (born 1978), basketball player
 Karsten Tadda (born 1988), basketball player
 Karl Borromäus Thumann (1820–1874), German theologian
 Oscar Wassermann (1869–1934), German banker
 Andrew Wooten (born 1989), German-American soccer player
 Karl Friedrich Gottlob Wetzel (1779–1819), writer and illustrator Fränkischer Merkur

Gallery

See also
 Bamberg (potato) (named after the town)
 Bamberg Symphony Orchestra
 Rintfleisch-Pogrom
 Franconia

References

 
 "Bamberg" at the Jewish Encyclopedia

External links

 Town of Bamberg: UNESCO Official Website
  
 Bamberg World Heritage Office
 Official tourist website
 Schlenkerla Brewery website
 Bamberg beer, official website
 Bamberg Tourist Guide - Youtube video

Bamberg
World Heritage Sites in Germany